Tramlapiola is a genus of crickets in the subfamily Pteroplistinae; species are found in Indo-China.

Species
The Orthoptera Species File lists:
 Tramlapiola bugiamap Gorochov, 2018
 Tramlapiola sylvestris Gorochov, 1990

References 

Orthoptera genera
Ensifera
Orthoptera of Indo-China